("The evening sky"), WAB 56, is a song composed by Anton Bruckner in 1866. It is the second setting of the work. In 1862, Bruckner had already composed a first setting of the song for men's voice quartet.

History 
Bruckner composed this second setting "evening song" Der Abendhimmel  on 6 December 1866. He used again the text of Joseph Christian von Zedlitz, which he had already used for the first setting in 1862. The piece was performed first by the Wiener Männergesang-Verein (men's singer society of Vienna) on 17 December 1898.

The original manuscript is stored in the archive of Österreichische Nationalbibliothek.

Music 

The 38-bar long work in F major is scored for  choir a cappella. This second setting of Der Abendhimmel exhibits several modulations and rests, which are characteristic of Bruckner's later melodies.

Discography 

A selection among the few recordings of Der Abendhimmel, WAB 56:
 Guido Mancusi, Chorus Viennensis, Musik, du himmlisches Gebilde! – CD: ORF CD 73, 1995
 Thomas Kerbl, Quartet of the Männerchorvereinigung Bruckner 08, Anton Bruckner – Männerchöre – CD: LIVA 027, 2008
Jan Schumacher, Camerata Musica Limburg, Serenade. Songs of night and love – CD:  Genuin GEN 12224, 2011

References

Sources 
 Anton Bruckner – Sämtliche Werke, Band XXIII/2:  Weltliche Chorwerke (1843–1893), Musikwissenschaftlicher Verlag der Internationalen Bruckner-Gesellschaft, Angela Pachovsky and Anton Reinthaler (editor), Vienna, 1989
 Uwe Harten, Anton Bruckner. Ein Handbuch. , Salzburg, 1996. .
 Cornelis van Zwol, Anton Bruckner 1824–1896 – Leven en werken, uitg. Thoth, Bussum, Netherlands, 2012. 
 Crawford Howie, Anton Bruckner - A documentary biography, online revised edition

External links 
 
  
 Der Abendhimmel F-Dur, WAB 56 – Critical discography by Hans Roelofs 
 A live performance by the MGV Liederkranz Cleeberg: Der Abendhimmel (Bruckner)

Weltliche Chorwerke by Anton Bruckner
1866 compositions
Compositions in F major